Chinnavar is a 1992 Tamil language drama film directed by Gangai Amaran. The film stars Prabhu, Chandrasekhar and Kasthuri. The film was released on 24 April 1992.

Plot 

Muthu and Veerasamy are fishermen and they fish together in the same boat. Muthu lives with his mother. Veerasamy loves to drink a lot of alcohol and he has a sister, Meena who is in love with Muthu. Muthu decides to marry his carefree friend Veerasamy to Ponni. In a financial trouble, Veerasamy joins Kumar's boat, Kumar is a rich fishermen union leader. Veerasamy realises that Meena is in love with Muthu and he promises to Muthu his sister's hand. Meanwhile, Kumar asks Veerasamy to marry Meena, compelled by his wife, Veerasamy accepts. Hopeless, Meena tied to herself a Thaali. She then says to Veerasamy that Muthu marries her and Muthu confirms to save her honour. Veerasamy gets angry but when Muthu says the truth, he apologises to him. Kumar beats Muthu's mother and kidnaps Meena, he arranges a forced marriage between him and Meena. Muthu saves her and he finally marries her with his best friend's blessing.

Cast 

Prabhu as Muthu alias Chinnavar
Chandrasekhar as Veerasamy
Kasthuri as Meena
Chithra as Ponni
Radha Ravi as Kumar
Goundamani
Senthil
Kovai Sarala as Sevattamma
S. N. Lakshmi as Muthu's mother
Disco Shanti as item number

Soundtrack 

The film score and the soundtrack were composed by Ilaiyaraaja. The soundtrack, released in 1992, features 7 tracks with lyrics written by, the director himself, Gangai Amaran.

Reception
The Indian Express wrote "Storytelling takes a backseat and charming cinematography and other fancy works rule the boost in Chinnavar".

References

External links 

1992 films
Films scored by Ilaiyaraaja
1990s Tamil-language films
Films directed by Gangai Amaran